Sex, Party & Lies is a 2009 Spanish coming-of-age comedy-drama film directed by Alfonso Albacete and David Menkes, starring Mario Casas, Yon González, Ana Polvorosa, Ana de Armas, Hugo Silva, Maxi Iglesias and Alejo Sauras.

Cast

Production
Sex, Party and Lies is a Tornasol Films and Castafiore Films production. In December 2010, the Ministry of Culture of Spain—then led by Ángeles González Sinde, who had been one of the co-screenwriters of the film five years before becoming minister—granted the film's producing companies €1 million, thus sparking a row of public strutiny and examination.

Release
The film premiered at the Las Palmas Film Festival in March 2009. Distributed by Sony Pictures, the film was theatrically released in Spain on 27 March 2009. It opened with a box office gross of €1,813,000 in its debut weekend.

See also
 List of Spanish films of 2009

References

External links
 

2009 films
2009 comedy-drama films
2009 LGBT-related films
2000s coming-of-age comedy-drama films
2000s sex comedy films
2000s Spanish-language films
2000s teen comedy-drama films
Films about drugs
Films directed by Alfonso Albacete
Films shot in Alicante
LGBT-related comedy-drama films
LGBT-related coming-of-age films
LGBT-related sex comedy films
Spanish comedy-drama films
Spanish coming-of-age drama films
Spanish LGBT-related films
Spanish sex comedy films
Spanish teen drama films
Teen LGBT-related films
Teen sex comedy films
Tornasol Films films
2000s Spanish films